Mahnalanselkä – Kirkkojärvi is a medium-sized lake in Finland. It is located in Pirkanmaa region in the Finnish Lakeland and in the Hämeenkyrö municipality. The lake is quite narrow and about 20 km long. There are four sub-lakes in the lake. The northeast part is called Kirkkojärvi, and southward is the Laitilansalmi strait, Kallioistenselkä open water, the Kallioistenahdas strait, the Mahnalanselkä open water and a narrow sublake called Jokisjärvi.

In Finland there are 17 lakes called Kirkkojärvi. This is the biggest of them.

See also
List of lakes in Finland

References

Kokemäenjoki basin
Lakes of Hämeenkyrö